Witbansong Station is a station of the Busan Metro Line 4 in Bansong-dong, Haeundae District, Busan, South Korea. The station name Dong-Pusan College which came from the nearby Dong-Pusan College was renamed to Witbansong which means the upper Bansong-dong on 1 January 2021 because Dong-Pusan College closed down in September 2020.

Station Layout

References

External links

  Cyber station information from Busan Transportation Corporation
 Rail.blue: Witbansong station information

Busan Metro stations
Haeundae District
Railway stations opened in 2011